The ADC Cirrus is a series of British aero engines manufactured using 
surplus Renault parts by the Aircraft Disposal Company (ADC) in the 1920s.

The engines were air-cooled, four-cylinder inline types. They were widely used for private and light aircraft.

Design and development
The Cirrus engine originated in Geoffrey de Havilland's 1924 quest for a powerplant suited to a light two-seat sports biplane which would become the de Havilland Moth. No suitable engine existed at the time, with both an appropriate level of power and light weight. The Aircraft Disposal Company, also known as Airdisco and ADC, were producing the low-cost Airdisco V8 which had been developed by Frank Halford from their large stocks of war surplus Renault V8 aero engines. De Havilland realised that half of this engine would make an air-cooled four-cylinder inline engine of just the right size and at low cost. He persuaded Halford to undertake its design and development.

The cylinders, pistons, con-rods and gearing were taken from the Renault, with the valve gear based on the Airdisco, and a new five-bearing crankshaft and cast crankcase were designed. It became the first Cirrus engine, and the first air-cooled four-cylinder inline aero engine to go into quantity production.

The original ADC Cirrus engines were all designed by Halford and built by ADC. The  Cirrus I, passed its 50-hour type rating in 1925. De Havilland launched his product as the Cirrus Moth and it proved a winning formula. The engine was soon adopted for other aircraft. Later versions named the Cirrus II, and Cirrus III were produced, each with slightly greater displacement and power (Cirrus II - 85 hp, Cirrus III - 90 hp).

ADC ceased manufacture when it ran out of surplus Renault engines around 1928.

Subsequent manufacture

When ADC ran out of parts, manufacture of the Cirrus III was taken up by Cirrus Aero Engines, also based at Croydon.

The Cirrus III was also adapted and improved by American Cirrus Engines, who manufactured it under license.

Variants

Cirrus I
(1925)
Cirrus II
(1926)
Cirrus III
(1929)

Applications
List from Lumsden except where noted. The list includes trial installations where a different engine was principally adopted.

Cirrus

Cirrus I

Avro Avian
Avro Baby
de Havilland DH.60 Moth
Short Mussel
Westland Widgeon

Cirrus II

Avro Avian
de Havilland DH.60 Moth
de Havilland DH.71 Tiger Moth
Piaggio P.9
Short Mussel
Westland Widgeon
Bloudek XV Lojze

Cirrus III

Avro Avian
Blackburn Bluebird
Cierva C.17
de Havilland DH.60 Moth
de Havilland DH.71 Tiger Moth
Dudley Watt D.W.2
Emsco B-4 Cirrus
Koolhoven FK.41
Klemm L.26
Klemm L.27
Short Mussel
Simmonds Spartan
Spartan Arrow
Westland Wessex
Westland Widgeon

Engines on display
A preserved ADC Cirrus II is on display at the Science Museum (London).

Specifications (Cirrus I)

See also

References

Notes

Bibliography

 The Aviation Ancestry Database of British Aviation Advertisements 1909–1990. Cirrus advertisements (retrieved 23 April 2020).
 Gunston, Bill. World Encyclopaedia of Aero Engines. Cambridge, England. Patrick Stephens Limited, 1989. 

 Lumsden, Alec. British Piston Engines and their Aircraft. Marlborough, Wiltshire: Airlife Publishing, 2003. .
 Taylor, Douglas R. Boxkite to Jet: The Remarkable Career of Frank B. Halford. Rolls-Royce Heritage Trust. 1999. .

1920s aircraft piston engines
Cirrus